Ivan Pokorný (born in 1952 in the Czech Republic) is an actor.

Biography
He graduated in Acting from the Theatre Faculty of the Academy of Fine Arts and in 1976-1983 and worked as an actor in various Czech theatres. He also had several roles in film and on television. In 1983 he emigrated to Austria, worked  as a lecturer at the Vienna Conservatory and in 1984-1998 as a director in Austrian and German theatres.

In 1995 he decided to return to the Czech Republic and has been working mainly as a director of TV-films since then. He also makes documentaries and is particularly interested in themes connected with the cultural history of his country.
In some projects he takes part as a producer or co-producer.

Filmography

Awards
for the feature film Kidnapped Home Bonton Prize at the Zlin Festival 2002;
First prize  - Ostrov nad Ohří 2002 for the documentary Czech and German …

References 

 https://www.imdb.com/name/nm1156141/
 http://www.sadk.de/pokorny.html
 http://www.coldsunday.com
 http://www.fdb.cz/lidi/34492-Ivan-Pokorny.html

1952 births
Living people
Czech film directors
Czech male film actors